The ibisbill  (Ibidorhyncha struthersii) is a bird related to the waders, but sufficiently distinctive to merit its own family Ibidorhynchidae. It is grey with a white belly, red legs and long down-curved bill, and a black face and black breast band. It occurs on the shingle riverbanks of the high plateau of central Asia and the Himalayas.

Taxonomy 
The ibisbill belongs to the order Charadriiformes which also includes the sandpipers, plovers, terns, auks, gulls, skuas and others. Although its evolutionary relationships are not fully understood, the ibisbill appears to be most closely related to a group including the oystercatchers, avocets, stilts and Pluvialis plovers, but sufficiently distinctive to merit its own family, Ibidorhynchidae. 

There are no subspecies. The species was described in 1831 by Vigors based on painting by John Gould although Brian Hodgson had sent a manuscript to the Asiatic Society of Bengal two years earlier describing it as the "Red-billed Erolia" but this was published only in 1835 with an apology from the editor. Hodgson later suggested a new genus name of Clorhynchus for the bird stating that Gould's description of Ibidorhyncha was inaccurate while Vieillot's Erolia had been rejected. The species is named in honour of Dr. Struthers who collected specimens of the bird from the Himalayas.

Description 

The adult is grey with a white belly, a crimson, long down-curved bill similar to that of the unrelated ibis, and a black face and black breast band. The sexes are similar, but young birds lack the black on the face and breast, and the bill is duller. The legs are greyish purple in the breeding adults and dull sepia in juveniles or greenish in younger or non-breeding adults. The legs of deceased ibisbills change color to a crimson similar to the bill shade shortly after death. The tarsi is short and reticulated. The ibisbill has three toes, lacking the hind toe. The outer and middle toes are connected by a small, indented web, while the middle and inner toes possess no webbing. The Ibisbill typically weighs  and females weigh slightly more than males. In spite of its spectacular appearance it is inconspicuous in its stony environment. The call is a ringing Klew-klew similar to that of a greenshank. In flight, its outstretched neck and rounded wings give an ibis-like appearance.

Distribution and habitat 
The Ibisbills are common in Central Asia and the Himalayas, from Lake Issyk-Kul to the southern border of Manchuria, in Russia in the Altai. They also live in the highlands of the Central and Northern Tien Shan, within Kazakhstan along the valleys of the rivers Bolshaya and Malaya Almatinka, Chilik, Issyk, Karkara, Bayankol, Dzhungar Alatau, Choldysu. 

The river valleys frequented by the ibisbill tend to have very little vegetation and gentle slopes to ensure a slow flow of water. It must live near slow-flowing water in order to feed, limiting its habitat despite a large range.

Behaviour 
During the autumn and winter, the ibisbill typically is solitary, though they can be found in pairs or in small flocks of up to eight birds. One group of 25 ibisbills has been reported. Ibisbills breed solitarily and are territorial, though limited habitat availability can cause ibisbills to breed while neighboring others. They are generally not shy of humans. They are good swimmers and prefer crossing rivers by swimming instead of flying.

Wintering birds tend to be fairly inactive, while they become more active and noisy as the breeding season approaches.

When scratching the feathers on their head with their toes, they reach from over the wings. This indirect approach pattern is also found in plovers and lapwings but not in stone-plovers and other waders that reach directly from under the wing.

Breeding 

The ibisbill is apparently a monogamous breeder. During the breeding season, the ibisbill is known to run short distances while holding the head down, only standing upright to look at its surroundings. The nest is located on a bank, island or peninsula on the river, and is little more than a scrape on the ground, which may sometimes be lined with small pebbles. Eggs are laid in the end of April and the beginning of May (exact timing varies due to the weather). The clutch size varies from two to four oval eggs. The behaviour of adults near the nest are said to be similar to lapwings. The exact time taken to incubate the eggs is unknown, but both parents share incubation duties. It is suspected that chicks from the previous brood may act as helpers at the nest.

Feeding 

The ibisbill feeds by probing under rocks or gravel on stream beds. It will take a variety of terrestrial and aquatic invertebrates including caddisfly and mayfly larvae that hide under boulders in streams, grasshoppers and also small fish.

Conservation status 

This species has an extremely large range, estimated at 5 million square kilometres (1.9 million square miles) which is not believed to declining or fragmentating. Although its population is unknown, it is not thought to be declining. For these reasons the species is evaluated as Least Concern by the IUCN.

References

Other sources
 Cordeaux, WW (1897) Notes on Ibidorhynchus struthersii. Ibis 7 3(12):563–564.
 Stanford, JK (1935) On the occurrence of the Ibisbill Ibidorhyncha struthersii (Gould) in Upper Burma. J. Bombay Nat. Hist. Soc. 38(2):403–404.
 Bailey, FM (1909) Nesting of the Ibis bill (Ibidorhynchus struthersi). J. Bombay Nat. Hist. Soc. 19(4):993–994.
 Whymper, SL (1910) A breeding ground of the Ibisbill (Ibidorynchus struthersi). J. Bombay Nat. Hist. Soc. 20(2):519–520.
 Whymper, SL (1906) Nesting of the Ibis-bill (Ibidorhynchus struthersi) and the Common Sandpiper (Totanus hypoleucus). J. Bombay Nat. Hist. Soc. 17(2):546–547.

External links
Ibisbill videos, photos & sounds on the Internet Bird Collection

Ibidorhynchidae
Birds of China
Birds of Tibet
Birds of Central Asia
Birds described in 1832
Taxa named by Nicholas Aylward Vigors
Birds of Myanmar